Jean-Olivier Briand (January 23, 1715 – June 25, 1794) was the bishop of the Roman Catholic Diocese of Quebec from 1766 to 1784.

Life
Jean-Olivier Briand was born at Plérin, Brittany on January 23, 1715. He studied at the Seminary of St. Brieuc and was ordained a priest in 1739. In 1741 he left for Canada with another priest, Abbé René-Jean Allenou de Lavillangevin, and the newly appointed bishop for Quebec City, Henri-Marie Dubreil de Pontbriand for whom Briand served as vicar-general. He ministered to the dying at the battle of St. Foy (1760), and after the bishop's death was appointed administrator of the diocese which then included Acadia, Louisiana, and Illinois.

In the aftermath of the French and Indian War, when many colonists abandoned the country, Briand foresaw that a change of allegiance was inevitable. The Prefect of the Propaganda, Cardinal Castelli advised the Canadian clergy "to forget that they were French". His predecessor, Bishop Pontbriand, reiterated the principle that Christians should accord princes the respect and obedience which is their due (Romans 13:1-7). Briand was able to diplomatically adapt to the new regime and so managed to maintain the rights of the Church without causing a confrontation with the authorities. When the Treaty of Paris was signed in 1763, he ordered a Te Deum for the cessation of the Seven Years' War and praised General Murray for his humanity towards the conquered. Briand was consecrated Bishop of Quebec in Paris on March 16, 1766.

When the Society of Jesus was suppressed in 1773, Briand forwarded a letter from the Holy see to the Jesuits in Pennsylvania and Maryland with a form acknowledging their acceptance of the decree, which they were to sign. However, he did not get involved beyond that, choosing not to engage in ecclesiastical matters outside his jurisdiction, so the priests remained free to manage their ministries and property.

Quebec Act

Background
Under the terms of the peace treaty, Canadiens who did not choose to leave became British subjects. For them to serve in public offices, they were required to swear an oath to the King that contained specific provisions rejecting the Catholic faith. Since many of the predominantly-Catholic Canadiens were unwilling to take such an oath, that effectively prevented large numbers of Canadiens from participating in the local governments.

The Royal Proclamation of 1763 forbade all settlement west of a line drawn along the Appalachian Mountains. British officials hoped the proclamation would reconcile American Indians to British rule and help to prevent future hostilities. The proclamation angered American colonists, who wanted to continue their westward expansion into new lands for farming and keep local control over their settled area.

Provisions
With growing unrest in the colonies to the south, the British were worried that the Canadiens might also support the rebellion. To secure the allegiance of the Canadiens to the British crown, the Quebec Act of 1774 was enacted. The Act expanded the province's territory into a portion of the Indian Reserve, to include the areas of Illinois, Indiana, Michigan, Ohio, Wisconsin, and parts of Minnesota. It restored the use of the French civil law for commercial and other matters of private law and guaranteed free practice of the Catholic faith and removed mention of the Protestant faith from the oath of allegiance. On the other hand, it forbade the bishop from corresponding directly with Rome and gave governors the right to oversee the appointment of parish priests and the selection of new ordinands. Those impediments were not insurmountable. Passage of the Quebec Act, admitting Catholics to public functions and confirming religious freedom was partly, because of Briand's efforts.

Reaction

As the Quebec Act was passed in the same legislative session as certain restrictive acts in response to the Boston Tea Party, it was viewed in the Thirteen Colonies as one of the Intolerable Acts. The colonists particularly decried the limitation of westward expansion and countenancing of "popery" in British territory. Chairman of New York City's Committee of Sixty, Isaac Low, claimed that the King had violated his oath by allowing Catholicism in Quebec. John Adams declared the Act "not only unjust to the People in that Province, but dangerous to the Interests of the Protestant Religion and of these Colonies." Alexander Hamilton feared that it would encourage the emigration of Catholics from Europe. The Pennsylvania Gazette, the Boston Evening Post, and the Newport Mercury all ran editorials railing against the Act, and the Post suggested that it was but a prelude to an invasion by Catholic Canadians.

The George Rex Flag was raised as a protest against the act and Catholicism on a liberty pole outside the New York Royal Exchange and from the Liberty Tree on Boston Common. The flag was adopted as the unofficial flag of the Province of New York during the war. Paul Revere created a cartoon for the Royal American Magazine called "The Mitred Minuet" depicting four Anglican Bishops dancing around a copy of the Quebec Act in support to of the Roman religion.

On 26 October 1774, the Continental Congress in Philadelphia approved a letter to be sent to the people of Canada inviting them to side with the rebel colonies. Shortly thereafter copies of a second letter of Congress, drafted by John Jay, Richard Henry Lee and William Livingston, dated October 21, 1774 entitled "Address to the people of Great Britain" began circulating. This letter disparaged the morals and religion of Canadiens, and expressed shock that Parliament would promote a religion that "disbursed impiety, bigotry, persecution, murder and rebellions through every part of the world."

American Revolution
Briand did not trust the American colonists, whose antipapal prejudice seemed clear. He was a notable opponent of the American Revolution and served as a useful ally to the British administration under Guy Carleton. In April 1776, the Continental Congress sent Samuel Chase, Benjamin Franklin, and Charles Carroll of Carrollton on a diplomatic mission to Canada, in order to seek assistance from French Canadians against the British. Carroll was an excellent choice for such a mission, being fluent in French and a Roman Catholic, and therefore well suited to negotiations with the French-speaking Catholics of Quebec. He was joined in the commission by his cousin John Carroll.

The commencement of the Invasion of Quebec and the American seizure of Fort Ticonderoga on May 10 prompted Briand, at the request of Governor Carleton, to issue a pastoral letter urging Canadiens to defend their country. It went largely unheeded, as the Canadiens, after so many years of war, while somewhat sympathetic to the Americans, were not interested in fighting for either side.

He notably excommunicated Maryland-born Jesuit priest John Carroll, when the latter tried to encourage Canadians to join the revolution or at least remain neutral. Carroll was apparently somewhat ambiguous about a clergyman being involved in political matters, took opportunity to accompany the ailing Franklin back to Philadelphia.

Later life
Briand, was invited by Cardinal Castelli, the Prefect of the Propaganda, to administer confirmation in Pennsylvania and Maryland, but abandoned the plan upon the recommendation of Father Ferdinand Steinmeyer, S.J. (popularly known as Father Farmer), who drew attention to the Anti-Catholic feeling which was then prevalent in the Colonies.

He resigned in 1784 to make room for a younger bishop. He retained episcopal powers but seldom exercised them during his last years.

References

Bibliography 

Laurent, Laval. Québec et l'église aux États-Unis sous mgr Briand et mgr Plessis / Laval Laurent ; Préf. de S. E. le card. Jean-M.-Rodrigue Villeneuve. Montréal : Librairie St-François, 1945. 258 p. : maps ; 24 cm
Oury, Guy-Marie. Mgr Briand, évêque de Québec, et les problèmes de son époque / Guy Marie Oury ; préface de Louis-Albert Vachon. Sablé-sur-Sarthes, France : Éditions de Solesmes ; [Sainte-Foy, Québec] : Éditions La Liberté, 1985. 245 p. : ill. ; 23 cm. 
Plessis, Joseph Octave. Oraison funèbre de Mgr Jean-Olivier Briand, ancien évêque de Québec [microform] : prononcée dans la cathédrale de Québec le 27 juin 1794 / par Joseph-Octave Plessis. Lévis [Québec] : Bulletin des recherches historiques, 1906. 1 microfiche (19 images)
Têtu, Henri, 1849–1915. Les évêques de Quebec [microform] / par Henri Tetu. Nouv. ed. a l'usage de la jeunesse. Tours France : A. Mame ; Montréal : Granger, 1983, c1899. 2 microfiches (80 images) : portr. 
Vachon, André. Mgr Jean-Olivier Briand, 1715-1794 Québec : Éditions des Dix, 1979. 31 p. ; 22 cm.

External links 
 

1715 births
1794 deaths
Roman Catholic bishops of Quebec
18th-century Roman Catholic bishops in New France
Burials at the Cathedral-Basilica of Notre-Dame de Québec